Zharf (also known as Jarf, Jaraf, and Jarif) is a village in Kabud Gonbad Rural District, in the Central District of Kalat County, Razavi Khorasan Province, Iran. At the 2006 census, its population was 448, in 113 families.

References 

Populated places in Kalat County